Lü is a village in the Val Müstair municipality in the district of Inn in the Swiss canton of Graubünden.  In 2009 Lü merged with Fuldera, Müstair, Santa Maria Val Müstair, Tschierv and Valchava to form the municipality of Val Müstair.

History
Lü is first mentioned in 1466 as Lug.

Geography

Of this area, 45.5% is used for agricultural purposes, while 34.5% is forested. Of the rest of the land, 1.5% is settled (buildings or roads) and the remainder (18.6%) is non-productive (rivers, glaciers or mountains).

The municipality is located in the Val Müstair sub-district (now Val Müstair municipality) of the Inn district. It consists of the village of Lü and the hamlet of Lüsai.

Demographics
Lü has a population of 63, of which 4.8% are foreign nationals.  Over the last 10 years the population has decreased at a rate of -19.8%.

, the gender distribution of the population was 47.7% male and 52.3% female. The age distribution, in Lü is; 9 children or 14.5% of the population are between 0 and 9 years old.  6 teenagers or 9.7% are 10 to 14, and 1 teenager is 15 to 19. The senior population distribution is 10 people or 16.1% of the population are between 60 and 69 years old, 2 people or 3.2% are 70 to 79, there are 4 people or 6.5% who are 80 to 89.

In the 2007 federal election the most popular party was the SVP which received 98% of the vote.  The rest of the votes went to the FDP (1%) and the SPS (0%).

The entire Swiss population is generally well educated.  In Lü about 71.9% of the population (between age 25-64) have completed either non-mandatory upper secondary education or additional higher education (either University or a Fachhochschule).

Lü has an unemployment rate of 0%.  , there were 16 people employed in the primary economic sector and about 8 businesses involved in this sector.  3 people are employed in the secondary sector and there are 2 businesses in this sector.  12 people are employed in the tertiary sector, with 2 businesses in this sector.

The historical population is given in the following table:

Languages
Most of the population speaks Rhaeto-Romance (82.3%), with the rest speaking German (17.7%)  In the valley, the Romansh speaking population speaks the Jauer dialect. In 1910 about 90% of the population spoke Romansh, in 1941 it was 96% and in 1970 it was 94%.  In 1990 98% understood Romansh even if wasn't their first language and in 2000 it was 87%.

Tourism
There is a small car parking in the village. A number of hiking trails start here, up the hills or down to the valley in summer and winter. In fall 2009 - the International Year of Astronomy - a public observatory Alpine Astrovillage Lü-Stailas was inaugurated. The Center is equipped with robotic telescopes for direct observations as well as for astrophotography. The equipment is also used in introductory courses for beginning amateur astronomers.

References

External links

 Alpine Astro Village

Val Müstair
Former municipalities of Graubünden